Nicolás Alejandro Frutos Cortino (born 10 May 1981) is an Argentine football coach and retired player. A striker during his playing career, he is an assistant coach for Major League Soccer club D.C. United.

Club career

Early career
Born in Santa Fe, Frutos started playing for Unión de Santa Fe and was later bought by San Lorenzo. Later, Spanish club Las Palmas signed him, but after an unsuccessful season of only one goal Argentina's Gimnasia y Esgrima de La Plata brought him back. He again found his level, catching Independiente's attention, whom he joined for the Apertura 2004, scoring 19 goals in 28 matches.

Frutos was as of 23 October 2005 the top scorer of the Apertura 2005 with nine goals in 11 matches, but he lost that position because he was not able to play for Independiente for the rest of the season.

Anderlecht
Frutos obtained a transfer from Independiente on 21 October 2005 but was only allowed to play for Anderlecht starting in January 2006.

In his first season with R.S.C. Anderlecht, he scored nine goals in the second half of the season and won the 2005–06 Belgian First Division.

The 2006–07 season yielded more goals for Frutos, as he scored 17 goals in 27 appearances in both the Jupiler League and the UEFA Champions League. His goal-scoring was sorely missed in the early part of the 2007–08 season, until his return in the 2–2 draw against Roeselare, where he was a substitute and scored the goal that leveled the match. Frutos also scored two goals against Hapoel Tel Aviv FC in the UEFA Cup group stage.

At the start of the 2009–10 season, he scored a goal against Süper Lig side Sivasspor during the third-round qualifying match for the UEFA Champions League after coming on as a substitute.

Retirement
Frutos announced his retirement from professional football on 29 March 2010 at the age of 28 due to tendinopathy of the Achilles tendon, which prevents him from playing at a competitive level.

Coaching career
One day after his retirement, it was announced that Frutos would work as a scout for his last club, R.S.C. Anderlecht. In 2011 he worked for Unión de Santa Fe as a coordinator for the youth teams and manager of their reserve team. He left his position in June 2013.

In 2015, he was a part of the technical staff at Club Olimpia. On 1 January 2016, Frutos returned to Anderlecht and took charge of the U19 team. On 18 September 2017, he was appointed as caretaker manager for the first team. He was in charge for four games, getting three victories and one defeat, before a new manager was appointed on 3 October 2017.

On 3 January 2019, he was appointed as manager of San Luis de Quillota. After adding just four points out of 18 possible, he was fired on 2 April 2019.

In February 2021, Frutos was appointed assistant coach of D.C. United.

Honours
 Belgian First Division A: 2006, 2007, 2010
 Belgian Cup: 2008
 Belgian Super Cup: 2006, 2007

References

External links
 

1981 births
Living people
Argentine sportspeople of Spanish descent
Argentine footballers
Argentine football managers
Footballers from Santa Fe, Argentina
Association football forwards
Unión de Santa Fe footballers
San Lorenzo de Almagro footballers
Nueva Chicago footballers
UD Las Palmas players
Club de Gimnasia y Esgrima La Plata footballers
Club Atlético Independiente footballers
R.S.C. Anderlecht players
Argentine Primera División players
Segunda División players
Belgian Pro League players
Argentina under-20 international footballers
Argentine expatriate footballers
Expatriate footballers in Spain
Argentine expatriate sportspeople in Spain
Expatriate footballers in Belgium
Argentine expatriate sportspeople in Belgium
R.S.C. Anderlecht non-playing staff
R.S.C. Anderlecht managers
San Luis de Quillota managers
D.C. United non-playing staff
Belgian Pro League managers
Primera B de Chile managers
Argentine expatriate football managers
Expatriate football managers in Paraguay
Argentine expatriate sportspeople in Paraguay
Expatriate football managers in Belgium
Expatriate football managers in Chile
Argentine expatriate sportspeople in Chile
Expatriate soccer managers in the United States
Argentine expatriate sportspeople in the United States